Panun Kashmir is a proposed union territory of India in the Kashmir Valley, which is intended to be a homeland for Kashmiri Hindus. The demand arose after the Exodus of Kashmiri Hindus in 1990. The vision of the homeland was elucidated in the Margdarshan Resolution of 1991. Panun Kashmir is also the name of an eponymously named organisation.

Origin and etymology

Panun Kashir is derived from Kashmiri , which means "our own Kashmir". The Panun Kashmir organisation was founded by Kashmiris, including Kashmiri Hindu writer and activist Agnishekhar, in 1990 after the exodus of Kashmiri Hindus from Kashmir, under threat from militants. Approximately 300,000 to 600,000 Kashmiri Hindus fled Kashmir due to rising armed rebellion in Kashmir. However, Panun Kashmir estimates nearly 700,000 refugees.

Proposed union territory of Panun Kashmir
The organisation passed a resolution, known as the Margdarshan Resolution, in Jammu in December 1991 demanding: (a) the establishment of a Homeland for the Kashmiri Hindus in the Valley of Kashmir comprising the regions of the Valley to the East and North of Jhelum River.

(b) that the Constitution of India be made applicable in letter and spirit in this Homeland in order to ensure right to life, liberty, freedom of expression and faith, equality and rule of law.

(c) that the Homeland be placed under the Central administration with a Union Territory status; and

(d) that all the seven hundred thousand Kashmiri Hindus, including those who have been driven out of Kashmir in the past and yearn to return to their homeland and those who were forced to leave on account of terrorist violence in Kashmir, be settled in the homeland on an equitable basis with dignity and honour.

Some advocates for Panun Kashmir wish that the majority of the valley of Kashmir and cities such as Srinagar, Anantnag, Sopore, Baramulla and Awantipora be included in the proposed union territory. However, the organisation claims that it in fact does not seek a Hindu homeland. Rather, it seeks a homeland for Kashmiri Hindus who are ready to live peacefully with their Muslim neighbours assuming the conditions are met for resettlement.

Support
The Panun Kashmir organisation has consistently pushed for a separate UT. The organisation also strongly supported the abrogation of Article 370 and Article 35a.

Ikkjutt Jammu, a political party in Jammu and Kashmir, openly advocates for a separate Panun Kashmir, as well as the separation of Jammu Division from Kashmir.

Opposition
On 28 November 2019, India's consul-general in New York proposed an "Israeli model" on Kashmir to help the Kashmiri Pandits  return to their homeland. His hour-long video sparked outrage. Muslim Kashmiri activists and some Hindu Kashmiris feared that this will lead to worsening military control, losing their jobs to outsiders, and the loss of their identity by causing Hindus to replace the Muslim majority. This proposition has been compared to a "settler-colonial project", and Pakistani Prime Minister Imran Khan condemned the proposal as reflecting "the fascist mindset of the Indian government".

After the murder of Rakesh Pandit by unidentified militants in June 2021, several members of the Panun Kashmir group proposed a military campaign to establish a separate Hindu region, where Kashmiri Pandits would be armed against local militants. That meeting and their proposed Union Territory has been opposed by Muslim activists, who compared the proposal to Israeli actions against the Palestinians.

See also
 Hinduphobia 
 Insurgency in Jammu and Kashmir
 Pakistan and state-sponsored terrorism
 Persecution of Hindus
 Women's rights in Jammu and Kashmir

References

External links
panunashmir.org

Ethnic cleansing in Asia
Proposed states and union territories of India
Forced migration
Kashmir conflict